Sir Frederick William Smith (1861 - 1926) was a South African businessman and legislator. He held the post of Mayor of Cape Town from 1908 to 1912.

Life
After holding the post of Mayor of Cape Town from 1908 to 1912, he remained on the Council as Deputy Mayor the following year. He was a vice president of the South African Society of Artists which was founded in 1902. He was also an early member of the Cape Town Photographic Society. Smith welcomed Robert Baden-Powell to Cape Town in 1912.

References

1861 births
1926 deaths